Kahawalage Gamini Perera (born 22 May 1964) is a former Sri Lankan cricketer who played one One Day International in 1986.

External links 

1964 births
Living people
Basnahira South cricketers
Sri Lanka One Day International cricketers
Sri Lankan cricketers
Antonians Sports Club cricketers
Moratuwa Sports Club cricketers